Lieutenant General Lâm Quang Thi (7 May 1932 – 19 January 2021) was a senior military officer in the Army of the Republic of Vietnam during the Vietnam War.

Early life and family
Lam was born in Bac Lieu in 1932 to a family of wealthy landowning farmers. Lam's parents met through a matchmaker and married two years before he was born. Lam's father came from a family of Cao Dai adherents while his mother was a Roman Catholic. His maternal grandfather was one of the richest Chinese landowners in Bac Lieu at the turn of the 20th century. Lam's parents separated in 1937 after their fourth child was born, and his mother took their four children back down to her hometown in Tam Vu. After completing his primary education there, Lam was sent to Can Tho for his secondary education, where he enrolled into the Phan Thanh Gian College after passing through its tough entrance examinations.

Military service
Lam graduated from the National Military Academy, in Da Lat, South Vietnam. He held the positions of Commander of the RVNAF Artillery Training Center, Commander of the Artillery in I Corps, Deputy Commander, RVNAF Artillery; Commander, 9th Infantry Division; and Commander of the Vietnamese National Military Academy. 

On 10 March 1972 he replaced Nguyễn Văn Hiếu as deputy commander of I Corps.

Last position until 4 1975: Commander in Chief of Army Corps I Forward Command.

Post-war life
Lam fled with his family to the United States in May 1975, when South Vietnam fell to the invading North Vietnamese army. He lived in Fremont, California. Lam earned a French Baccalaureate Degree in Philosophy and an MBA, both from Golden Gate University in San Francisco.  His son, Andrew Lam, is a writer and a journalist.

Lam was interviewed about the war in Ken Burns's series The Vietnam War.

Death
Lam died from COVID-19 in Fremont, California, on 19 January 2021, aged 88, during the COVID-19 pandemic in California.

Awards and decorations
Vietnam Gallantry Cross
Distinguished Service Order, 1st class
Vietnam Armed Forces Honor Medal, 1st class
National Order of Vietnam, 3rd class
Staff Service Honor Medal, 1st class
Vietnam Technical Service Medal, 1st class
Training Service Honor Medal, 1st class
Vietnam Civil Action Honor Medal, 1st class
Merit Thai
Legion of Merit (United States)
Order of Military Merit, Chung Mu Cordon (South Korea)

References

Bibliography
 Lam, Quang Thi, The Twenty-Five Year Century: A South Vietnamese General Remembers the Indochina War to the Fall of Saigon, University of North Texas Press, 2001, 
 Lam, Quang Thi, Hell in An Loc: The 1972 Easter Invasion and the Battle That Saved South Viet Nam, University of North Texas Press, 2011,

External links
Book Review of The Twenty-five Year Century: A South Vietnamese General Remembers the Indochina War to the Fall of Saigon by General Lam Thi Quang
A Vietnamese Response to McNamara War was lost in Washington, not in Saigon by Lam Quang Thi posted by the Pacific News Service
My Father's Army Uniform  by Andrew Lam
The Twenty-five Year Century: A South Vietnamese General Remembers the Indochina War to the Fall of Saigon
30 Years After the Vietnam War: China Remains a Threat
Setting the Record Straight on South Vietnam
Waterloo unearths some enlightening findings about the writer's father, a former general for South Vietnam.

1932 births
2021 deaths
People from Bạc Liêu Province
Hoa people
Army of the Republic of Vietnam generals
American people of Chinese descent
Foreign recipients of the Legion of Merit
Military personnel from California
Golden Gate University alumni
Non-U.S. alumni of the Command and General Staff College
3 Lam, Quang Thi
Recipients of the Gallantry Cross (Vietnam)
Recipients of the Distinguished Service Order (Vietnam)
Recipients of the Order of Military Merit (Korea)
Vietnamese emigrants to the United States
Deaths from the COVID-19 pandemic in California
People from Fremont, California